In enzymology, a coniferyl-alcohol dehydrogenase is an enzyme that catalyzes the chemical reaction

coniferyl alcohol + NADP+  coniferyl aldehyde + NADPH + H+

Thus, the two substrates of this enzyme are coniferyl alcohol and NADP+, whereas its 3 products are coniferyl aldehyde, NADPH, and H+.

This enzyme belongs to the family of oxidoreductases, specifically those acting on the CH-OH group of donor with NAD+ or NADP+ as acceptor. The systematic name of this enzyme class is coniferyl-alcohol:NADP+ oxidoreductase. This enzyme is also called CAD.

References

 
 

EC 1.1.1
NADPH-dependent enzymes
Enzymes of unknown structure